Keijo Lehdikkö (4 June 1920 – 20 February 1958) was a Finnish speed skater. He competed in the men's 500 metres event at the 1948 Winter Olympics.

References

1920 births
1958 deaths
Finnish male speed skaters
Olympic speed skaters of Finland
Speed skaters at the 1948 Winter Olympics
Sportspeople from Helsinki